Carlo Emanuele Buscaglia (22 September 1915 – 24 August 1944) was an Italian aviator, and one of the most famous Italian pilots of World War II.

Buscaglia was born in Novara, Piedmont, in 1915 and entered the Italian  Accademia Aeronautica (Air Force Academy) in October 1934. In 1937 he was made Sottotenente (2nd Lieutenant).

On 1 July 1937 Buscaglia was assigned to the 50th Squadron (32nd Bomber Wing), then equipped with the obsolete Savoia-Marchetti S.M.81, but later replaced with the more efficient SM.79. In 1939 he was promoted to full Lieutenant. The following February he was transferred to the 252nd Squadron (46th Bomber Wing), and with this unit he took part in his first military mission, on 21 June 1940.

On 25 July he volunteered to join the Reparto Speciale Aerosiluranti ("Special Torpedo-Bomber Detachment") of the Regia Aeronautica, later renamed the 240th Torpedo-Bomber Squadron, based in Libya. On the night of 17 September 1940, Buscaglia obtained his first success with a torpedo-armed SM.79, heavily damaging the cruiser HMS Kent. In early December he also successfully attacked the cruiser HMS Glasgow.

In January 1941 Buscaglia's unit was transferred to Catania, from where he took part in the action with some German Ju 87s in which the carrier  was badly damaged. Promoted to Captain, Buscaglia was made commander of a new torpedo unit, the 281st Squadron, based at the Grottaglie airport in Apulia. From there he took part in the Battle of Cape Matapan.

By 1942 Buscaglia had already obtained the Silver Medal of Military Valor five times, and the German Iron Cross second class. In April he was selected to command the new 132nd Torpedo Group, subsequently sinking several ships in the Mediterranean. On 12 August of that year, together with the German ace Hans-Joachim Marseille, he was received in Rome by Benito Mussolini, who promoted him to Major.

On 12 November 1942, during an action against the Allied invasion of North Africa, Buscaglia's aircraft was shot down by a British Spitfire. He was declared "killed in action" and a Gold Medal of Military Valor awarded posthumously. However, although wounded and badly burned, Buscaglia had survived, having been captured by Allied troops and transferred to a prisoner-of-war camp in the United States at Fort Meade.

After the armistice of 8 September 1943, Buscaglia was asked to fight alongside the Allies, as a member of the newly formed Aeronautica Cobelligerante del Sud. In the meantime, in the northern part of Italy still occupied by Germany, a wing of the Aeronautica Nazionale Repubblicana (the Air Force of the puppet Italian Social Republic), the 1° Gruppo Aerosiluranti, was named after him.

On 15 July 1944 Buscaglia assumed command of the 28th Bomber Wing, equipped with Martin Baltimores and based on Campo Vesuvio airport, near Naples. On 23 August, while attempting to fly one of the new aircraft without an instructor, Buscaglia crashed on take-off. He died the following day in a hospital in Naples.

The 3rd Wing of the current Aeronautica Militare Italiana, based at Villafranca di Verona, was named after him.

External links
www.aeronautica.difesa. Official biography (Italian)

1915 births
1944 deaths
People from Novara
Italian World War II pilots
Recipients of the Gold Medal of Military Valor
Italian military personnel killed in World War II
Aviators killed in aviation accidents or incidents in Italy
Shot-down aviators
Italian prisoners of war
Victims of aviation accidents or incidents in 1944
World War II prisoners of war held by the United States
Regia Aeronautica personnel of World War II